In Ohio, State Route 52 may refer to:
U.S. Route 52 in Ohio, the only Ohio highway numbered 52 since 1927
Ohio State Route 52 (1923-1927), now SR 4 (Middletown to Dayton), SR 444 (Dayton to Fairborn), and CR 333 (Fairborn to Springfield)